Lehigh is a city in Marion County, Kansas, United States.  As of the 2020 census, the population of the city was 161.  It is located between Hillsboro and Canton on the north side of U.S. Route 56.

History

Early history

For many millennia, the Great Plains of North America was inhabited by nomadic Native Americans.  From the 16th century to 18th century, the Kingdom of France claimed ownership of large parts of North America.  In 1762, after the French and Indian War, France secretly ceded New France to Spain, per the Treaty of Fontainebleau.

19th century
In 1802, Spain returned most of the land to France.  In 1803, most of the land for modern day Kansas was acquired by the United States from France as part of the 828,000 square mile Louisiana Purchase for 2.83 cents per acre.

In 1854, the Kansas Territory was organized, then in 1861 Kansas became the 34th U.S. state.  In 1855, Marion County was established within the Kansas Territory, which included the land for modern day Lehigh.

The source of the Lehigh name was not well documented. One of the rumors is the city being slightly higher altitude which was "lay high" above the prairie, the other rumor that it was named by representatives of Lehigh County, Pennsylvania who came to Kansas and considered settling the area in the 1870s or 1880s.

Four and one half miles north of Lehigh is the junction of the old Santa Fe Trail and Chisolm Trail, which is near the site of the municipal water well for the city.  The Santa Fe Trail was active across Marion County from 1821 to 1866, and the Chisholm Trail was active from 1867 to 1871.

As early as 1875, city leaders of Marion held a meeting to consider a branch railroad from Florence.  In 1878, Atchison, Topeka and Santa Fe Railway and parties from Marion County and McPherson County chartered the Marion and McPherson Railway Company.  In 1879, a branch line was built from Florence to McPherson, in 1880 it was extended to Lyons, in 1881 it was extended to Ellinwood.  The line was leased and operated by the Atchison, Topeka and Santa Fe Railway.  The line from Florence to Marion, was abandoned in 1968.  In 1992, the line from Marion to McPherson was sold to Central Kansas Railway. In 1993, after heavy flood damage, the line from Marion through Lehigh to McPherson was abandoned and removed.  The original branch line connected Florence, Marion, Canada, Hillsboro, Lehigh, Canton, Galva, McPherson, Conway, Windom, Little River, Mitchell, Lyons, Chase, Ellinwood.  The 1879 depot from Lehigh was moved to Walton, Kansas.

A post office was established at Lehigh on April 23, 1880.

Lehigh was platted in 1881.

20th century
Lehigh was incorporated in 1901 and at the time of the 1910 census had a population of 385. At one time it boasted a bank, several mercantile businesses, and a German weekly Mennonite newspaper, Das Echo, started in 1897.

The National Old Trails Road, also known as the Ocean-to-Ocean Highway, was established in 1912, and was routed through Lehigh, Hillsboro, Marion, Lost Springs.

Geography
Lehigh is located at coordinates 38.3727872, -97.3030858 in the scenic Flint Hills and Great Plains of the state of Kansas. The county line is 3.5 miles west of Lehigh. The North and South Cottonwood River start a few miles northwest of Lehigh.

Area Events
 Lehigh Antique Tractor & Engine Show, every Memorial Day.

Area attractions
 Santa Fe Trail
 Santa Fe Trail / Chisholm Trail Marker, approximately 3.5 miles west and next to U.S. Route 56 highway.
 Santa Fe Trail Markers, numerous markers in the area.
 Santa Fe Trail Self-Guided Auto Tour.
 Marion Reservoir, approximately 10 miles east of Lehigh.

Demographics

2010 census
As of the census of 2010, there were 175 people, 70 households, and 49 families residing in the city. The racial makeup of the city was 96.6% White, 2.9% from other races, and 0.6% from two or more races. Hispanic or Latino of any race were 4.0% of the population.

There were 70 households, of which 32.9% had children under the age of 18 living with them, 54.3% were married couples living together, 7.1% had a female householder with no husband present, 8.6% had a male householder with no wife present, and 30.0% were non-families. 27.1% of all households were made up of individuals, and 12.9% had someone living alone who was 65 years of age or older. The average household size was 2.50 and the average family size was 3.02.

The median age in the city was 32.8 years. 29.7% of residents were under the age of 18; 8.7% were between the ages of 18 and 24; 24.6% were from 25 to 44; 23.4% were from 45 to 64; and 13.7% were 65 years of age or older. The gender makeup of the city was 50.9% male and 49.1% female.

2000 census
As of the census of 2000, there were 215 people, 77 households, and 62 families residing in the city. The racial makeup of the city was 93.95% White, 4.65% Native American, and 1.40% from two or more races. Hispanic or Latino of any race were 1.40% of the population.

There were 77 households, out of which 37.7% had children under the age of 18 living with them, 75.3% were married couples living together, 2.6% had a female householder with no husband present, and 18.2% were non-families. 18.2% of all households were made up of individuals, and 6.5% had someone living alone who was 65 years of age or older. The average household size was 2.79 and the average family size was 3.14.

In the city, the population was spread out, with 31.6% under the age of 18, 4.2% from 18 to 24, 27.0% from 25 to 44, 20.0% from 45 to 64, and 17.2% who were 65 years of age or older. The median age was 36 years. For every 100 females, there were 97.2 males. For every 100 females age 18 and over, there were 90.9 males.

As of 2000 the median income for a household in the city was $38,958, and the median income for a family was $41,875. Males had a median income of $35,000 versus $20,714 for females. The per capita income for the city was $14,554. About 6.8% of families and 8.6% of the population were below the poverty line, including 19.0% of those under the age of eighteen and none of those 65 or over.

Government

Lehigh has a government consisting of a Mayor and Five City Council.  The council meets the 2nd Monday of each month at 7:30PM.
 City Hall, 110 E Main St.
 U.S. Post Office, 112 W Main St.

Education
The community is served by Hillsboro USD 410 public school district.  The high school is a member of T.E.E.N., a shared video teaching network between five area high schools. All students attend schools in Hillsboro.

Lehigh Rural High School was closed after the spring graduation in 1966. The Lehigh High School mascot was Lehigh Eagles.

Media

Print
 Hillsboro Star-Journal, local newspaper from Hillsboro.
 Hillsboro Free Press, free newspaper for greater Marion County area.

Radio
Lehigh is served by numerous radio stations of the Wichita-Hutchinson listening market area, and satellite radio.  See Media in Wichita, Kansas.

Television
Lehigh is served by over-the-air ATSC digital TV of the Wichita-Hutchinson viewing market area, cable TV, and satellite TV.  See Media in Wichita, Kansas.

Infrastructure

Transportation

Utilities
 Internet
 Satellite is provided by HughesNet, StarBand, WildBlue.
 TV
 Satellite is provided by DirecTV, Dish Network.
 Terrestrial is provided by regional digital TV stations.
 Electricity
 Rural is provided by Flint Hills RECA.
 Water
 City is provided by City of Lehigh.
 Rural is provided by Marion County RWD #4 (map).

Gallery
 Historic Images of Lehigh, Special Photo Collections at Wichita State University Library.

See also
 National Register of Historic Places listings in Marion County, Kansas
 Historical Maps of Marion County, Kansas
 Chisholm Trail
 Santa Fe Trail
 National Old Trails Road

References

Further reading

External links

City
 Lehigh - Directory of Public Officials, League of Kansas Municipalities
Historic
 Marion County cemetery list, archive of KsGenWeb
 Marion County history bibliography,  Marion County school bibliography, Kansas Historical Society
Maps
 Lehigh city map, KDOT
 Topo Map of Lehigh / Goessel area, USGS

Cities in Kansas
Cities in Marion County, Kansas
Populated places established in 1881
1881 establishments in Kansas